The "PayPal Mafia" is a group of former PayPal employees and founders who have since founded and/or developed additional technology companies such as Tesla, Inc., LinkedIn, Palantir Technologies, SpaceX, Affirm, Slide, Kiva, YouTube, Yelp, and Yammer. Most of the members attended Stanford University or University of Illinois Urbana–Champaign at some point in their studies.

History
Originally, PayPal was a money-transfer service offered by a company called Confinity which was acquired by X.com in 1999. Later, X.com was renamed PayPal and purchased by eBay in 2002. The original PayPal employees had difficulty adjusting to eBay's more traditional corporate culture and within four years all but 12 of the first 50 employees had left. They remained connected as social and business acquaintances, and a number of them worked together to form new companies and venture firms in subsequent years. This group of PayPal alumni became so prolific that the term PayPal Mafia was coined. The term gained even wider exposure when a 2007 article in Fortune magazine used the phrase in its headline and featured a photo of former PayPal employees in gangster attire.

Members
Individuals whom the media refers to as members of the PayPal Mafia include:
 Peter Thiel,  PayPal founder and former chief executive officer who is sometimes referred to as the "don" of the PayPal Mafia
 Max Levchin, founder and chief technology officer at PayPal
 Elon Musk, co-founder of Zip2, founder of X.com which merged with Confinity to form PayPal. Musk later founded SpaceX,co-founded Tesla, Inc., co-founded OpenAI, Neuralink, founded The Boring Company, and became owner of Twitter, Inc.
 David O. Sacks, former PayPal COO who later founded Geni.com and Yammer
 Scott Banister, early advisor and board member at PayPal.
 Roelof Botha, former PayPal CFO who later became a partner and Senior Steward of venture capital firm Sequoia Capital
 Steve Chen, former PayPal engineer who co-founded YouTube.
 Reid Hoffman, former executive vice president who later founded LinkedIn and was an early investor in Facebook, Aviary
 Ken Howery, former PayPal CFO who became a partner at Founders Fund
 Chad Hurley, former PayPal web designer who co-founded YouTube
 Eric M. Jackson, who wrote the book The PayPal Wars and became chief executive officer of WND Books and co-founded CapLinked
 Jawed Karim, former PayPal engineer who co-founded YouTube
 Jared Kopf, former PayPal (executive assistant to Peter Thiel) who co-founded Slide, HomeRun and NextRoll
 Dave McClure, former PayPal marketing director, a super angel investor for start up companies
 Andrew McCormack, co-founder of Valar Ventures
 Luke Nosek, PayPal co-founder and former vice president of marketing and strategy, became a partner at Founders Fund with Peter Thiel and Ken Howery
 Keith Rabois, former executive at PayPal who later worked at LinkedIn, Slide, Square, Khosla Ventures, and currently with Peter Thiel at Founders Fund, and personally invested in Tokbox, Xoom, Slide, LinkedIn, Geni, Room 9 Entertainment, YouTube, and Yelp
 Jack Selby, former vice president of corporate and international development at PayPal who co-founded Clarium Capital with Peter Thiel, later becoming managing director of Grandmaster Capital Management
 Premal Shah, former product manager at PayPal, became the founding president of Kiva.org
 Russel Simmons, former PayPal engineer who co-founded Yelp Inc.
 Jeremy Stoppelman, former vice president of technology at PayPal who later co-founded Yelp
 Yishan Wong, former engineering manager at PayPal, later worked at Facebook and became the CEO of Reddit

Legacy
The PayPal Mafia is sometimes credited with inspiring the re-emergence of consumer-focused Internet companies after the dot-com bust of 2001. The PayPal Mafia phenomenon has been compared to the founding of Intel in the late 1960s by engineers who had earlier founded Fairchild Semiconductor after leaving Shockley Semiconductor. They are discussed in journalist Sarah Lacy's book Once You're Lucky, Twice You're Good.  According to Lacy,  the selection process and technical learning at PayPal played a role, but the main factor behind their future success was the confidence they gained there. Their success has been attributed to their youth; the physical, cultural, and economic infrastructure of Silicon Valley; and the diversity of their skill-sets. PayPal's founders encouraged tight social bonds among its employees, and many of them continued to trust and support one another after leaving PayPal. An intensely competitive environment and a shared struggle to keep the company solvent despite many setbacks also contributed to a strong and lasting camaraderie among former employees.

See also
Traitorous eight

References

 
History of Silicon Valley
Mafia